Matheus da Cunha Gomes (born 28 February 1996), commonly known as Matheus Índio, is a Brazilian footballer who plays as an attacking midfielder for Vitória S.C..

References

1996 births
Living people
Footballers from Rio de Janeiro (city)
Brazilian footballers
Brazilian expatriate footballers
Brazil youth international footballers
Association football forwards
Campeonato Brasileiro Série A players
Primeira Liga players
Arsenal F.C. players
Clube Atlético Penapolense players
Santos FC players
CR Vasco da Gama players
G.D. Estoril Praia players
Boavista F.C. players
Cruzeiro Esporte Clube players
Botafogo Futebol Clube (SP) players
Al-Nasr SC (Salalah) players
Brazilian expatriate sportspeople in England
Brazilian expatriate sportspeople in Portugal
Brazilian expatriate sportspeople in Oman
Expatriate footballers in England
Expatriate footballers in Portugal
Expatriate footballers in Oman